Blue marlin is a common name for fish in the genus Makaira

Blue marlin may also refer to:

 MV Blue Marlin, a heavy transport ship

 The Blue Marlin, a 1991 fishing video game for the Nintendo Entertainment System